Beryozovka is a rural locality (a settlement) in Kolenovskoye Rural Settlement, Novokhopyorsky District, Voronezh Oblast, Russia. The population was 352 as of 2010. There are 6 streets.

Geography 
Beryozovka is located 49 km west of Novokhopyorsk (the district's administrative centre) by road. Nekrylovsky is the nearest rural locality.

References 

Populated places in Novokhopyorsky District